Bridgeman Island or Bridgemans's Island or Bridgman Island or Helena Island is one of the South Shetland Islands. Bridgeman Island is an established name dating back to about 1820. Bridgeman Island is the remnants of a much larger volcanic edifice that is now largely submerged. The eroded volcano does not display youthful volcanic features. Several reports of 19th-century fumarolic activity may instead refer to the much younger Penguin Island.

Geology
The island is the top of a Pleistocene-Recent stratovolcano within the Bransfield Basin.  The volcano has a base diameter of 25 km, and a height of 1050 m.

See also 
 Composite Antarctic Gazetteer
List of Antarctic and sub-Antarctic islands
 List of Antarctic islands south of 60° S
List of volcanoes in Antarctica
 SCAR
 Territorial claims in Antarctica

References

External links 
 Website with a picture of Bridgeman Island
 Website with another picture of Bridgeman island, in Spanish.

Islands of the South Shetland Islands
Pleistocene stratovolcanoes
Volcanoes of the South Shetland Islands
Extinct volcanoes